Carlos Chávez (1899–1978), Mexican composer, conductor and educator.

Carlos Chávez may also refer to:

 Carlos Chávez (footballer) (born 1984), Colombian footballer
 Carlos Chávez (weightlifter) (1928–2006), Panamanian Olympic weightlifter
 Carlos Manuel Chávez (born 1931), cardiovascular and thoracic surgeon
 Carlos Chávez (football administrator) (1958–2018), head of the Bolivian Football Federation
 Carlos Bonilla Chávez (1923–2010), Ecuadorian classical guitar player
 Carlos Chávez (tennis) (born 1963), Guatemalan tennis player